The 1958 Inter-Cities Fairs Cup Final was the final of the first Inter-Cities Fairs Cup. It was played on 5 March and 1 May 1958 between London XI of England and Barcelona XI (represented by Barcelona). Barcelona XI won the tie 8–2 on aggregate.

Match details

First leg

Second leg

See also
1955–58 Inter-Cities Fairs Cup
FC Barcelona in international football competitions

References
RSSSF

2
Inter-Cities Fairs Cup Final 1958
1958
Inter-Cities Fairs Cup Final 1958
Inter-Cities Fairs Cup Final 1958
Inter-Cities Fairs Cup Final
Inter-Cities Fairs Cup Final
Inter-Cities Fairs Cup Final
Inter-Cities Fairs Cup Final
Sports competitions in Barcelona
Inter-Cities Fairs Cup Final, 1958
Inter-Cities Fairs Cup Final